Xiao Yanning (born 23 February 1998) is a Chinese competitor in synchronised swimming.

She won a silver medal at the 2015 World Aquatics Championships as the youngest athlete on the Chinese team. She also won 2 bronze medals at the 2014 FINA World Junior Synchronised Swimming Championships.

External links
 

1998 births
Living people
Chinese synchronized swimmers
World Aquatics Championships medalists in synchronised swimming
People from Dazhou
Synchronized swimmers from Sichuan
Synchronized swimmers at the 2015 World Aquatics Championships
Synchronized swimmers at the 2017 World Aquatics Championships
Asian Games gold medalists for China
Medalists at the 2018 Asian Games
Artistic swimmers at the 2018 Asian Games
Asian Games medalists in artistic swimming
Artistic swimmers at the 2019 World Aquatics Championships
Artistic swimmers at the 2022 World Aquatics Championships
Synchronized swimmers at the 2020 Summer Olympics
Olympic synchronized swimmers of China
Olympic silver medalists for China
Olympic medalists in synchronized swimming
Medalists at the 2020 Summer Olympics